During the 1997–98 English football season, Sheffield United competed in the Football League First Division.

Season summary
On 5 August 1997, Nigel Spackman was appointed as permanent manager of Sheffield United and his side had a good start to the season but huge losses and high wages from the previous season's promotion failure led to enforced sales of key personnel. The final straw being the sale of both of the club's top scoring strikers (Brian Deane – 11 league goals – went to S.L. Benfica & Jan Åge Fjørtoft – 9 league goals – to Barnsley) on the same day. Even though leaving midseason, Deane would go on to become the team's top scorer that year, such was the lack of replacements. Spackman was unhappy over this and resigned in March 1998, leaving Thompson and Slade in caretaker charge until the end of the season. The Blades finished in the playoffs but came up short in the playoff semi-finals against Sunderland, losing 3–2 on aggregate.

Final league table

Results
Sheffield United's score comes first

Legend

Football League First Division

First Division play-offs

FA Cup

League Cup

Players

First-team squad
Squad at end of season

Notes

References

Sheffield United F.C. seasons
Sheffield United